The 2004 Football Conference play-off Final took place on 16 May 2004 and was contested between Aldershot Town and Shrewsbury Town. It was held at the Britannia Stadium, Stoke-on-Trent. A crowd of 19,216 attended the game (a Conference Play-off final record at the time), with just over 12,000 travelling from Shropshire.

Match

Summary
Aldershot had the first real chance of the game when Roscoe Dsane got on the end of a ball over the top of the defence and held off Shrews captain Darren Tinson, only to drag his shot wide. Jon Challinor then had a chance but failed to connect properly with Aaron McLean's cutback. At the other end it took a crucial intervention from Dominic Sterling to deny Jamie Tolley after a good surging run from the midfielder.

Aldershot took the lead in the 36th minute when Shots captain Ray Warburton headed on a free kick and McLean powered the ball into the net. However Shrewsbury were level just minutes later, with Duane Darby smashing in an almost identical goal. In the second half the Shropshire side should have taken the lead when Luke Rodgers crossed for Ryan Lowe, who blazed over from inside the area.

With the scores level at 1–1, silver goal extra time was required, and Lee Charles had a couple of chances to win it for the Shots. Ultimately the match needed a penalty shoot-out to be settled. After Rodgers had missed Shrewsbury's first kick, goalkeeper Scott Howie was the hero, saving all three of Aldershot's penalties while teammates Tolley, Jake Sedgemore and finally Trevor Challis scored theirs to send Shrewsbury back into the Football League.

Details

Play-off Final 2004
Play-off Final 2004
Play-off Final 2004
2004
Football Conference Play-off Final 2004
Football Conference play-off Final
Play-off National League Final 2004